Inveraray Shinty Club (Camanachd Inbhir Aora) is a shinty club from Inveraray, Argyll, Scotland. The first team plays in the National Division and the reserve team in South Division 2.

External links 

Official website

Shinty teams
Sport in Argyll and Bute
Sports clubs established in 1877
1877 establishments in Scotland